Boyd Mill Place, also known as Davenport's Mill and Hearon's Mill, is the site of a historic grist mill constructed circa 1870 in Weston, Georgia in Webster County, Georgia. The mill was built by John Boyd and operated from c.1870 to 1963.  Water supply for the mill is behind a  earthen dam.

It was added to the National Register of Historic Places on September 24, 2009. It is located at 580 Mill Pond Road.		

The listing includes four contributing buildings and one other contributing structure.  It includes the grist mill, a New South Cottage-style house for the miller (c.1910), and associated outbuildings: a pole barn (1993), a shed, a chicken house.

See also
National Register of Historic Places listings in Webster County, Georgia

References

External links
Boyd Mill Place photograph

Grinding mills in Georgia (U.S. state)
Buildings and structures in Webster County, Georgia
Industrial buildings and structures on the National Register of Historic Places in Georgia (U.S. state)
Industrial buildings completed in 1870
1870 establishments in Georgia (U.S. state)